Arcade's Greatest Hits: The Atari Collection 2 is a 1998 compilation of six arcade games: Gauntlet, Marble Madness, Paperboy, RoadBlasters, Crystal Castles, and Millipede for the Sony PlayStation and Microsoft Windows. Crystal Castles and Millipede were licensed from Atari Corporation while the others were owned by the Midway-owned Atari Games. The compilation contains artwork and info on each game, and all games are presented in their original format.

The PlayStation version is only compatible with the original PlayStation, as it has compatibility issues with the PlayStation 2. The model of the PlayStation 2 doesn't matter; the issue pertains to all models of the system.

Windows version
The Windows version includes 
Gauntlet, Marble Madness, Paperboy, RoadBlasters, 720°, and Vindicators

Reception

The compilation was well received, with the Official UK PlayStation Magazine saying that it was "the best retro collection to date", but that most of the games failed to hold their own in the 1990s. They noted that Marble Madness played better with a joypad than with the original trackball, and that Paperboy was the highlight.

See also
 Arcade's Greatest Hits: The Atari Collection 1

References

1998 video games
Midway video game compilations
Atari video game compilations
PlayStation (console) games
PlayStation (console)-only games
Multiplayer and single-player video games
Video games developed in the United States
Digital Eclipse games